Federal Polytechnic, Mubi is a polytechnic based in Mubi, Adamawa State, northeastern Nigeria.

The Federal Polytechnic, Mubi is one of the seven Federal Polytechnics established by Decree No. 33 of 1979. It opened in August of the same year as the Federal Polytechnic, Yola, on the rocky side of the north bank of Benue River. Following a Presidential directive, the Polytechnic was relocated to Mubi in October 1982 but still maintain its site in Yola as Consultancy Services Unit.

In Mubi the institution inherited the building of the defunct Federal School of Arts and Sciences. At present the infrastructures so inherited are being renovated and refurbished to suit Polytechnic requirement. More recently however, complete new science and engineering laboratories, workshops and studio have sprung up with heavy machines telling the tales of modem technology. A standard lecture theater, a library complex, a duplex Office block for the School of Business and General Studies, a block of offices and classrooms for the department of Basic & Applied Sciences, Agricultural Science complex, Food Science & Technology complex and an additional female hostel block among others, are now also in place.

On its movement to Mubi, it took over the facilities of the defunct Federal School of Arts and Science. The Polytechnic commenced operations with programs in Preliminary Studies in the Sciences and Management. The products of these programmes formed the bulk of the candidates admitted for the pioneer National Diploma Programames in the ten Departments of the Polytechnic as at then. These were Agricultural Technology, Food and Chemical Technology, Instrumentation and Analysis, Hotel and Catering Management, Land Surveying, Civil Engineering, Electrical Engineering, Mechanical Engineering, Secretarial Studies and Business Administration and Management. The National Certificate in Education (NCE) was later introduced in 1982.

The programs in the Polytechnic continued to grow modestly but steadily such that by 2006 the institution had fourteen academic departments and over 3000 students, well above the initial 138 students. Since August 2007, under the progressive leadership of Dr. Mustapha Mohammed Barau, the Polytechnic experienced a monumental growth. As at the 2009/2010 academic session the institution had a students population of well over 14,000 and 36 accredited programs with most modern infrastructure to match. A plan for additional school and seventeen academic departments has reached an advanced stage. The number of staff, which at inception was ten has also grown to about two thousand.

The Federal Polytechnic, Mubi, the foremost educational institution of its type in the North-east sub-region, operates school system running various programs in several disciplines at the levels of Higher National Diploma, Higher Diploma, National Diploma, Diploma and Certificate. There are also Sandwich programs offered during the long vacation in addition to the planned Bachelor of Technology (B.Tech.) degree program. The Polytechnic has six schools and a Center for Entrepreneurship Education.

Since inception, the Polytechnic has endeavored to empower so many with both the technical and entrepreneurial skills needed to fight and alleviate poverty.

A massacre occurred at the Polytechnic on 1–2 October 2012.

References

1979 establishments in Nigeria
Education in Adamawa State
Educational institutions established in 1979
Mubi
Federal polytechnics in Nigeria